Thienhaus NO v Metje & Ziegler Ltd and Another is an important case in South African property law. It was heard in the Appellate Division, by Steyn CJ, Van Blerk JA, Ogilvie Thompson JA, Williamson JA and Wessels JA, on 22 February 1965, with judgment handed down on 1 April.

Facts 
G owed money to M, the respondent. The debt was secured by a mortgage passed on property belonging to B in favour of M. The mortgage bond was incorrectly worded to indicate that the debt was owed by SG (who happened to be the sole shareholder of G). When B became insolvent, T was appointed liquidator. M sought a preferential right in terms of the mortgage bond, but this claim was rejected by T on the grounds that, due to the factual inaccuracy, the mortgage had not come into existence.

Judgment 
The court held, firstly, that a mortgage bond may be used both as an instrument of hypothecation and also as a record of debt, and secondly that it is matter of custom in drafting mortgage bonds to incorporate an admission of liability by the mortgagor to facilitate a quick and easy remedy.

References

Books 
 PJ Badenhorst, JM Pienaar and H Mostert Silberberg and Schoeman's The Law of Property 5 ed (2006).
 H Mostert and A Pope (eds) The Principles of The Law of Property in South Africa 1 ed (2010).

Cases 
 Thienhaus NO v Metje & Ziegler Ltd and Another 1965 (3) SA 25 (A).

Notes 

1965 in South African law
1965 in case law
South African property case law
Appellate Division (South Africa) cases